The Javan cuckooshrike (Coracina javensis) is a species of bird in the family Campephagidae.
It is endemic to the island of Java in Indonesia.
Its natural habitat is subtropical or tropical moist lowland forest.

References 

Javan cuckooshrike
Birds of Java
Javan cuckooshrike
Taxonomy articles created by Polbot